Gran Hermano 2015 is the eighth season of the Argentinian version of the reality show Gran Hermano. This season was confirmed in December 2014 by the main executive of the network Liliana Parodi. It was the first season to be broadcast on América TV after being previously in Telefe. The premiere was set for Wednesday 29 April 2015, being delayed one week from its original debut date. This season will come three years after the end of the most recent one. This season finished on 30 September 2015, after 155 days, becoming the second longest season ever produced in the country after the seventh season.

Jorge Rial announced that he would return to the show's main hosting duties, after leaving the position halfway during the previous season due to personal issues. Pamela David, one of America's main personalities, took over on hosting the show's Debates and Daily Highlights.

Production

The House

With the network change, Endemol now has a major role in the show's production, and now the house will be at Endemol's Estudios Mayor, which are located in the Buenos Aires neighborhood of Palermo, in a specific area known as "Palermo Hollywood". The architectural design of the house is work of Alberto Negrin. The studio where the house is located was used previously by El Trece for a show called La Casa de los Artistas which was broadcast in 2013.

Casting

Reportedly, over 30,000 people auditioned on the open casting calls made by producers between January and February 2015. By March 2015, host Jorge Rial mentioned during his show Intrusos about some of those who showed up in these audition calls, those named include: Gran Hermano Spain 10 finalist Almudena Martinez; former "Los Wachiturros" member Emanuel Ghidone; former gang leader Tamara Blanco, known as "The Cheta"; Tomas Loyola aka "Tomasito Suller" who previously participated in GH 2012; former cumbia group "Volcano" lead singer Roberto Edgar; Cristian, who is son of former Gran Hermano 2007 and Gran Hermano Famosos contestant Diego Leonardi.

Housemates

Summary 

 On 17 April 2015, Melanie Defederico was announced as a "housemate" by Jorge Rial in his show Intrusos, however, due to the exposure she got the days after the news were made official, she was dropped from the official shortlist and will be replaced by an auditionee.
 On the premiere, the 14 official housemates for this season were revealed, plus, an "enigmatic" 15th housemate (Francisco, who is in the middle of a paternity controversy between him, model Gisela Bernal and her husband Ariel Diwan, baby he says is not his. However, by early August 2015, it was confirmed that Francisco is the actual father of that baby, since a DNA test was done on Diwan and came back negative) and they are the ones listed below.
 On Day 36, during the 3rd round of nominations, after constant rule breaking, a Double Eviction was announced on that Gala (June 3, 2015). Now, on Day 43 (June 10, 2015), it was announced that the replacement revealed to go in during that night's show will be decided by the audience, three of the evicted housemates up to that point (Camila, Matias & Solano) plus two candidates from the open calls (Angela & Belen B.) will face off in a public vote to determine who will go in. That public vote will open on Day 44 (June 11, 2015), as during the 3rd Eviction gala was not possible due time constrains. The voting took place for about 24 hours, and on Day 45 (June 12, 2015), Matías Schrank, two days after being evicted with the most votes in the Double Eviction, was brought back in the game by the public with 36% of all votes cast.
 The remaining candidates in the "Comeback" vote (Angela, Belén B., Camila & Solano) were exposed to public vote after Matías' re-entrance. On Day 50 (June 17, 2015), Ángela was voted into the house by viewers, and also, it was announced that another double eviction (this time a definitive one) will take place on Day 57 (June 24, 2015).
 On Day 80 (July 17, 2015), Francisco left the house for a few hours to see the birth of his daughter Elena. Almost three weeks later, on Day 99 (August 5, 2015) he left the house temporarily again, as for not being married to the baby's mother, he had to attend a judicial precinct to formalize the registry of the child.
 After Angie's eviction on Day 85, it was announced that another "Comeback" vote will happen. This time it was divided by gender and two housemates were going to enter, for the men the candidates were Eloy & Mariano (who voluntarily left the house that same gala) while for the women were Angie, Maria Paz, Valeria & new candidate Florencia. On Day 93 (July 30, 2015), during a special scheduled live show due to the network's decision to avoid broadcasting the show against a big soccer match happening the day before, Mariano & Florencia entered the house as the respective winners of the vote and the rest of the housemates were automatically nominated for eviction due constant rule breaking and nomination plotting.
 Two days later, on Day 95 (August 1, 2015), Brian was ejected from the house after attacking love-interest Marian the night before inside the house's sauna during their weekly Friday night party. A special live show aired that same day, to let Brian know about the producers' decision, and social media went on blast regarding this situation.
 This series has faced during its run thus far, many incidents where people go to the precincts of the house's location and start shouting to the contestants remaining inside the house, because of these repeated situations, Nicolás decided to quit on Day 108 (August 14, 2015) as he overheard people from outside yelling "María Paz was with Mariano when he was outside" (or a phrase pretty much close to that), he also revealed during that night's Debate that the couldn't handle the pressure of living in the House and dealing with the game.
   On Day 113 (August 19, 2015), 2 brand new housemates entered the house, and they had connections to the other housemates. They were Yazmín Farjat (Marian's sister) & Eloy Lancelotta (Brian's brother), Rial explained in the liveshow, that both Yazmín and Eloy will stay in the house for a full week, however the public will then decide if either one of them stays or if both will stay in the game. The public was given three choice in that special voting round: A-Save Eloy; B-Save Yazmín; C-Save both. On Day 120 (August 26, 2015) It was revealed that Eloy had the most votes and entered the game while Yazmín was evicted.

Nominations table 
The first name means two points and the second one, one point.

Notes 
 : Nicolás, Brian & Matías were under suspicion of forming a plot against Francisco. So, as Brian & Matías did vote for him, their votes were nulled. 
 : Camila had the fulminated nomination and automatically nominated Francisco. 
 : Mariano was automatically nominated as he entered the red room first. 
 : Eloy quit the weekly task "The Servants" and because of that, those who were the servants with him (Mariano & Valeria) were all automatically nominated for eviction. 
 : Matías used the fulminated nomination and automatically nominated Brian. 
 : In Week 7 there was a repeschage round, also including potential housemates. For the running to (re-)enter the house were: Camila, Matías, Solano (as evicted housemates), Ángela and Belén B. (as potential housemates). On Day 45, Matías received the most votes with 36.8% and returned to the house on that same night. Lines were re-opened for the restant housemates. On Day 50, Ángela received the most votes and is officially a new housemate. Camila, Solano and Belén B. were then officially out of the game. Matías and Angie won immunity from the nominations for being new housemates. 
 : Romina used the fulminated nomination and automatically nominated María Paz. 
 : Angie was nominated for revealing too much information from the outside world on Day 55. 
 : María Paz used the fulminated nomination and automatically nominated Matías. 
 : Brian & Marian was automatically nominated by Gran Hermano (Big Brother) after bad behavior and verbal violence between each other. 
 : Francisco used the fulminated nomination and automatically nominated Romina. 
 : In Week 13, Big Brother decided to enter two participants to the house, a man and a woman. Among men were Mariano and Eloy R., and among women were Ángela, Maria Paz, Valeria and a new candidate called Florencia Zaccanti. In the 7th gala nomination results who were entering they occurred. On the women's side, I entered the house for the first time Florencia Zaccanti with 25.3% of the vote. And on the side of men, with 35.2% of the votes, he reentered the house Mariano.
 : Matías used the fulminated nomination and automatically nominated Belén. 
 : Francisco was automatically nominated as he entered the red room first. 
 : All contestants were nominated by penalty. 
 : Mariano used the fulminated nomination and automatically nominated Belén. 
 : Francisco, Marian, & Mariano was automatically nominated by Gran Hermano (Big Brother) after receiving a punishment due to their actions during the week.
 : Nicolás was nominated but decided to leave the house in the middle of the nominations. 
 : On Day 113, 2 brand new housemates entered the house, and they had connections to the other housemates. They were Yazmín Farjat (Marian's sister) & Eloy Lancelotta (Brian's brother), Rial explained in the liveshow, that both Yazmín and Eloy will stay in the house for a full week, however the public will then decide if either one of them stays or if both will stay in the game. The public was given three choice in that special voting round: A-Save Eloy; B-Save Yazmín; C-Save both. On Day 120 it was revealed that Eloy had the most votes and entered the game while Yazmín was evicted.
 : In Week 13, Big Brother decided to enter two participants to the house, between Ángela, Camila, Eloy R., Francisco and Romina. Francisco returned with 47.6% of the vote, and Camila returned with 42% of the vote. 
 : Belén used the fulminated nomination and automatically nominated Mariano. 
 : Marian remained on board after receiving punishment for talking about the production. 
 : Belén, Francisco & Matías received the fewest votes to evict and therefore saved from eviction. Marian and Mariano remained nominated and one of them will leave next week.

Trivia 
On Day 155 (September 30, 2015), the final took place, with Francisco Delgado becoming the winner with 52.7% of all votes against Matías Schrank in the final duel, the 19-year-old student finished as this season's runner-up. The only housemate that never quit or was evicted this season and survived all the way until the end, Belén Etchart, finished in third place while Mariano Berón, who quit and was brought back to the game a week after his exit through public voting, came in fourth place. Francisco Delgado, is the second winner in this franchise to quit the game at some point (he walked out of the game on Day 113), came back and won the season (Francisco returned to the game on Day 120 by a special public vote), the first one to achieve such a feat was Cristian Urrizaga from Gran Hermano Argentina 6.

Also, out of the 4 finalists, three (Francisco, Mariano and Matías) at some point of the game have either been evicted or walked out of the house voluntarily (Matías was evicted on Day 43, Mariano walked on Day 85 and Francisco quit on Day 113) and returned to the game about a week later (Matías re-entered through a public vote on Day 45, Mariano did the same on Day 93 and Francisco did so on Day 120), this has never been seen in a final of this franchise.

References

2015 Argentine television seasons
08